The Tla'amin First Nation (Comox language: ɬəʔamɛn), formerly Sliammon Indian Band or Sliammon First Nation, is a First Nations self governing nation whose lands and traditional territories are located on the upper Sunshine Coast in southwestern British Columbia, Canada. The Tla'amin are closely related to the Klahoose and Homalco peoples and have shared their adjoining territories; formerly all three as well as K'omoks were grouped collectively as the Mainland Comox due to their shared language. They have been part of the Coast Salish indigenous peoples  of the western coast of Canada since ancient times.

The territory of the Tla'amin people extends from the vicinity of Stillwater and the northern part of Texada Island, northward along the Malaspina and Gifford Peninsulas to the southern area of Homfray Channel and part of Cortes Island, including also the smaller off-shore islands such as Hernando, Savary and Harwood as well as Powell, Goat and Haslam Lakes.

Their ancestral tongue is ʔayʔaǰuθəm (Ay-A-Ju-Thum) which is shared with the Klahoose, Homalco & K'omoks peoples.  Historically, the Tla'amin, Klahoose and Homalco were all one people with no borders or separation. The three communities shared the village of q̓aq̓ɛyq̓ay (Grace Harbour) during the winter months and practiced the winter ceremonies that were held by the Coast Salish People. The use of Skway Skway masks, ceremonial songs and dances and potlatching and feasting were common here.  Today, Tla'amin's main village lies at t̓išosəm which translates to 'milky waters from herring spawn'. The Nation has over 1100 registered members and about half reside on Tla'amin lands. 

The community has been growing over the years and include the brand new Tla'amin Governance House, A Health Centre, Ahms Tah Ow school, Chi-Chuy (Daycare/Pre-School), Two Soccer Fields, Tla'amin Salish Centre (gymnasium used as the community hall), Development Corporation offices and more.  

The Tla'amin executive board has in early 2022 posted a desire to co-operate with Telus on a project for a Telus-owned 5G tower (page 18) on their privately-owned land on Rexford Road, Cortes Island, and have asked for public input regarding the proposed project.  Strathcona Regional District representatives raised some concerns with the plan, particularly around the frequencies that would be used on the tower, potential locations and whether or not the project interfered with the SRD’s own Connected Coast project.  Cortes Island director Noba Anderson voiced her concern that by leasing land from the Tla’amin Nation, the SRD would not be included in any consultation because they have no jurisdiction.

Brian Gregg of Sitepath Consulting is the Telus contact for the public consultation, which according to a Campbell River Mirror article posted on  January 13, 2022 ended at the end of January 2022.  In their April 2022 Nehmotl newsletter issue, the deadline for input was posted as extended to April 30, 2022. It was reported that input from approximately 136 people was received. Of the 136, 17% were in support and 75% expressed concern or non-support.  Despite this opposition from the community, the executive board has expressed a desire to create a motion in support of the project.

History

The Tla'amin people have thousands of years of history on the lands in which they call home. Through their connection to the land, the Tla'amin have a rich culture that has been passed down through generations of learning. The Tla'amin people are a part of the greater Northern Coast Salish peoples which also include the ƛoʔos (Klahoose), χʷɛmaɬku (Homalco) & K'omoks. 

Other traditional village sites occupied by the Tla'amin include: 

 toqʷanan - Theodosia Inlet
 toxʷnač - Okeover Inlet
 p̓aq̓iʔaǰɩm - Maple Village, Cortes Island
 ʔagayqsən - Ahgykson Island (Harwood)
 qʷoqʷnɛs - Stillwater
 χakʷum - Grief Point
 t̓atlaχʷnač - Blubber Bay

Treaty & Self Government

In 1994, the Sliammon Indian Band submitted a Statement of Intent to begin negotiations with the Government of Canada, and Province of British Columbia to establish a treaty. The process lasted 22 years for the Tla'amin Nation, who are now a self-governing treaty nation. 

1994: Sliammon enters Stage One of the BC Treaty Process with a Statement of Intent.

1996: Sliammon enters into Stage Two of the BC Treaty Process.

1996: Sliammon enters Stage Three of the BC Treaty Process. 

2001: A community vote was held in 2001 on an agreement in principle. This was a split vote – 51% voted no while 49% voted yes.

2003: Again the community voted in 2003 on an agreement in principle and this passed by 63% yes and 37% no.

2011: Tla'amin, Canada and BC Initial Final Agreement

2014: The Tla'amin Final Agreement was given royal assent in British Columbia on March 14, 2014.

June 16, 2012: Initial vote on the Tla'amin Final Agreement blocked by protesters.

April 5, 2016: At midnight, the Tla'amin Nation became a self-governing nation after the implementation of the Tla'amin Final Agreement. 

The Tla'amin Final Agreement was given royal assent in British Columbia on March 14, 2014.

The Sliammon First Nation is a member government of the Naut'sa mawt Tribal Council. Their offices are located in the town of Powell River.

See also
Comox language

References

External links
Sliammon First Nation website
Naut'sa Mawt Tribal Council website
Sliammon Treaty Society website
 Campbell River Mirror article, January 13, 2022
April 2022 Newsletter
June 2022 Newsletter

Coast Salish governments
Sunshine Coast (British Columbia)
K'omoks